James Bryant may refer to:

Sports 
 James Bryant (American football) (born 1985), American football full back
 James Bryant (Australian cricketer) (1826–1881), Australian cricketer
 James Bryant (South African cricketer), (born 1976), South African cricketer

Other people
 James Bryant (journalist), journalist and civil rights activist in Omaha, Nebraska
 James Fraser Bryant (1877–1945), lawyer, judge and political figure in Saskatchewan, Canada
 P. James Bryant, pastor of Wheat Street Baptist Church in Atlanta, Georgia
 Jimmy Bryant (1925–1980), American country music guitarist
 Jimmy Bryant (singer) (1929–2022), American singer, arranger and composer

Other uses
 James Bryant House, Moore County, North Carolina, USA; an NRHP-listed building

See also 

 Bryant (surname)
 James Bryant Conant (1893–1978), American chemist
 Peter James Bryant, U.S. actor

 James (disambiguation)
 Bryant (disambiguation)